AVB may refer to:

People
Abraham van Beijeren (1620–1690), still-life painter
Armin van Buuren (born 1976), DJ and trance music producer
Anthony Vanden Borre (born 1987), footballer
André Villas-Boas (born 1977), Portuguese football manager
Antônio Villas Boas (1934–1992), Brazilian farmer

Other uses
Acappella Vocal Band, a musical group also known as All Vocal Band
Anahim Volcanic Belt, a geological feature in British Columbia, Canada
April Verch Band
Airbus versus Boeing, competition between the aircraft manufacturers
Atmospheric vacuum breaker, a plumbing device
Atrioventricular block, a heart disease
Audio Video Bridging, an IEEE 802.1 standards initiative
AvalonBay Communities, Inc., an American real estate company
Avantix Mobile, a portable ticket machine on British railways
Aviano Air Base in northern Italy